The following is an incomplete list of the rulers of the Kingdom of Matamba, a late medieval West−Central African state centered in a region of present day Angola.

History
The Kingdom of Matamba was ruled by native Northern Mbundu kings and queens since at least the early 16th century.  During much of this time it was a nominal vassal to the powerful Kingdom of Kongo to its north.

In 1631, Matamba was invaded by the warrior queen Nzinga Mbande of the neighboring Northern Mbundu Kingdom of Ndongo. From then on, the state would be ruled by Ndongo monarchs of the Guterres Dynasty.

List

Matamba monarchs

Ndongo monarchs—Guterres dynasty

See also

References
 Fernando Campos: Conflitos na dinastia Guterres através da sua cronologia1, África: Revista do Centro de Estudos Africanos. USP, S. Paulo, 27-28: 23-43, 2006/2007

.
Angolan royalty
Rulers Of Matamba
Matamba
17th century in Angola
18th century in Angola
19th century in Angola